 
Unless a visa or an official warrant is issued by Azerbaijani authorities, the government of Azerbaijan condemns any visit by foreign citizens to the Republic of Artsakh, its surrounding territories and the Azerbaijani enclaves of Artsvashen, Karki, Yuxarı Əskipara, Barxudarlı and Sofulu which are de jure part of Azerbaijan under Armenian control. Azerbaijan considers entering these territories through Armenia (as it is usually the case) a violation of its visa and migration policy. Foreign citizens who enter these territories will be permanently banned from entering Azerbaijan and will be included on the list of "unwelcome people" by the Ministry of Foreign Affairs of Azerbaijan.

The Ministry of Foreign Affairs of Azerbaijan has explained the matter as: 
The Ministry of Foreign Affairs of the Republic of Azerbaijan would like to remind all nationals of foreign countries wishing to travel to Nagorno-Karabakh and other occupied regions of Azerbaijan that due to continuing occupation by the Armed Forces of Armenia, these areas are temporarily out of control of the Republic of Azerbaijan.
Any visit without the consent of the Republic of Azerbaijan to the above-mentioned territories, which are internationally recognized as an integral part of Azerbaijan is considered as a violation of sovereignty and territorial integrity of the Republic of Azerbaijan and as a breach of national legislation, as well as relevant norms and principles of international law.

Accordingly, the Ministry calls all foreign nationals to refrain themselves from travelling to the occupied territories in and around the Nagorno-Karabakh region of the Republic of Azerbaijan.

The Ministry would like to remind that those who traveled to the occupied territories without prior permission of the Republic of Azerbaijan will be denied the entry to the Republic of Azerbaijan. In case of necessity, appropriate legal actions will be taken with regard to these persons.

As of 10 September 2020, the list of people declared personae non gratae included 1020 people.

List

Date unknown 
 Caroline Cox, member of the British House of Lords
 Shreela Flather, member of the British House of Lords
 Stephen Pound, British MP
 Michèle Rivasi, French Member of the European Parliament
 Damien Abad, French Member of the European Parliament
 Eduardo Eurnekian, Argentine businessman of Armenian descent
 Tsvetana Paskaleva, Bulgarian journalist of Armenian descent
 Aleksey Kochetkov, former director of the CIS-EMO
/ Alan Yelbakiyev, former adviser to the President of South Ossetia
/ Anastasia Taylor-Lind, reporter at The New York Times

2007 
 Kaupo Känd, senior adviser to the OSCE High Commissioner 
 Mila Alečković Nikolić, Serbian professor and member of the Writers Union 
 Dave Loewen, City Councillor of Abbotsford 
 Sergey Markedonov, Russian MP
 Valeri Spektor, President of the National Security Affairs of the Academy of Sciences of Russia
 Sergey Glotoy, Deputy Chairman of the State Duma Committee on Regulations and Organizational Issues 
 Yelena Semerikova, Member of Russian Public Chamber 
 Rumen Batalov, Russian political scientist
 Sergei Valentinovich Pughacyov, Ukrainian city council member

2008 
 Eckart Stratenschulte, director of the Europäische Akademie Berlin

2009 
/ Hamed Kazemzadeh Director of Caucasus Studies Institute and Professor in Canada

2010
 Harout Chitilian, Canadian politician
 Reda Haddad, former MP from Jordan
 Konstantin Zatulin, Russian MP
 Maksim Mishenko, Russian MP 
 Andrey Kuraev, Russian Orthodox Priest
 Igor Chernishenko, Russian MP
 Kirill Cherkasov, Russian MP
 Tatyana Volozhinskaya, Russian MP
 Galina Ratnikova, international observer
 Andrei Areshev, expert of Strategic Culture Foundation of Russia
 Viktor Sheyns, Russian political scientists, economist
 František Mikloško, Slovak politician 
 François Rochebloine, French MP
 Arlette Grosskost, French MP
 Pascale Crozon, French MP
 Dzovinar Melkonian, Paris representative of France Institute of Democracy and Cooperation 
 Maurice Bonneau, independent French observer
 Richard Mallie, French MP
 René Rouquet, French MP
 Michel Diefenbacher, French MP
 Jean-Pierre Delannoy, secretary of the France-Armenia Friendship Group
 Michel Porret, French lawyer
 Moris Bonno, French MP
 Rubik Sardaryan, Iranian MP
 Martin Makdal, Czech MP
 Alen Fresnel, French MP
 Tomasz Poręba, Polish member of the European Parliament
 Hartmut Egger, professor of Free University of Berlin
 Bernard Coulie, Belgian academic
 Fransua de Kort, Belgian academic
 Jean Marisa, Belgian academic
 Bernard Snoy, Belgian professor
 Michael Kambek, German politician
 Peter Schreiner, German academic
 Alexandra Vorontsova, Russian politician
 Sergey Popov, Russian politician
 Michael Kovak, head of the Netherlands-US mission
 Gordon Marsden, British MP
 Anastasios Nerantzis, Greek MP
 Martin Mahdal, Czech film director
 Rubik Sardarian, member of Iran-Armenia friendship union
 Mirghassem Momeni, member of Iran-Armenia Friendship society
 Jose Arbo, parliamentarian from Argentina
 Sergio Nahabetian, former parliamentarian from Argentina of Armenian descent

2011
 Sergei Buntman, Russian journalist
 Yuri Snigirev, Russian journalist of Izvestia
 Yuri Vasiliyev, Russian painter
 Valeri Obedkov, Russian painter
/ Diana Markosian, U.S. and Russian photojournalist of Armenian descent
/ Alexander Lapshin, Russian-Israeli blogger
 Stephan Vermeersch, musician
 John Whittingdale, British MP
 Will Englund, correspondent for The Washington Post
 Joe Simitian, California senator of Armenian descent
 Kutlay Erk, Turkish Cypriot politician
 Emine Çolak, Turkish Cypriot politician
 Meltem Samani, Turkish Cypriot historian and peace activist
 Tomas Ladiga, Lithuanian musician
 Abigail Sin, Singaporean musician
 Valérie Boyer, French MP
 Guy Teissier French MP
 Jacques Remiller, French MP
 Georges Colombier, French MP
 Alain Néri, French MP

2012
 Walt Secord, Australian politician 
 Pavel Chernev, Bulgarian politician and lawyer 
 Jim Karygiannis, Canadian MP 
 Makvala Gonashvili, chairman of the Georgian Writers Union
 Marius Chelaru, Romanian poet 
 Philippe Marini, French Senator
 Sophie Joissains, French Senator
 Bernard Fournier, French Senator
 Charles Duke, US astronaut and Air Force brigadier general 
 Claude Nicollier, the first astronaut from Switzerland
 Meinrad Schade, Swiss photographer 
 Ueli Leuenberger, Swiss MP
 Luc Barthassat, Swiss MP 
 Dominique de Buman, Swiss MP
 Keith David Watenpaugh, American historian and professor
 Otto Luchterhandt, legal expert
 Hans-Jürgen Zahorka, German Member of European Parliament 
 Nikos Lygeros, Greek academic
 Aleksandr Balberov, Russian MP
 Aleksei Martynov, Russian Director of Institute of New States
 Denis Dvornikov, Member of the Public Chamber of Russia
 Ivan Sukharev, Russian MP
 Stanislav Tarasov, Russian journalist
 Vitali Skripchenko, Russian writer
 Daniël van der Stoep, Dutch member of the European Parliament
 Gert Laursen, Danish information technology specialist
 Mateusz Piskorski, Polish politician 
 Jorge Orrico, Uruguayan MP
 Rubén Martínez Huelmo, Uruguayan senator
 Ricardo Planchón Geymonat, Uruguayan MP
 Richard Sander, Uruguayan MP
 Daniel Radio, Uruguayan MP

2013
/ Bedros Kirkorov, Bulgarian-Russian singer of Armenian descent
 Anna Chapman, Russian journalist and agent
 Montserrat Caballé, Spanish opera singer
 Ewald Stadler, Austrian member of the European Parliament
 Eleni Theocharous, Cypriot member of the European Parliament
 Kyriacos Triantaphyllides, Cypriot member of the European Parliament
 David Turashvili, Georgian writer and playwright
 Beso Khvedelidze, Georgian writer
 Matthias Wilkes, German mayor 
 Jonathan O'Dea, Australian MLC
 Marie Ficarra, Australian MLC
 Gladys Berejiklian, Premier of New South Wales
 Amanda Fazio, Australian MLC
 Fred Nile, Australian MLC
 David Clarke, Australian MLC
 Russell Pollard, photojournalist
 William Zartman, American professor
 Terrence Hopmann, American professor
 John Pérez, Speaker of the California State Assembly
 Bob Blumenfield, Member of the Los Angeles City Council
 Milena Gabanelli, Italian journalist

2014
 Anastasia Karimova, Russian journalist
 Alexander Shmelev, Russian journalist
 Alisa Ganieva, writer-journalist
 Dmitry Bavyrin, Russian journalist
 Marina Skorikova, Russian journalist
 Svetlana Shmeleva, Russian journalist
 Alain Néri, French MP

2015
 Lyubov Kazarnovskaya, Russian opera singer

2016
 Antonia Arslan, Italian writer
 John Marshall Evans, former United States ambassador to Armenia

2017
 Rubina Berardo, Member of the Assembly of the Republic
 Anthony Bourdain, TV personality and chef
 Tulsi Gabbard, member of the U.S. House of Representatives
 Frank Pallone, member of the U.S. House of Representatives
 David Valadao, member of the U.S. House of Representatives

2019
 Martin Sonneborn, Member of the European Parliament
 Ronnie Grob, journalist, editor-in-chief at Swiss monthly magazine Schweizer Monat

2020
 Harald Maass, Cicero magazine correspondent
 Lukas Rühli, journalist at Schweizer Monat
 Anthony Ung, Accused another student of plotting and threatening a school shooting against Cherry Hill High School East, helped Cherry Hill High School West file a frivolous lawsuit against the school which caused a 6 January-style attack against the school's administration, and later became its principal and instituted fascist policies.
 Stephan Bader, journalist at Schweizer Monat
 Stephan Rindlisbacher, journalist at Schweizer Monat
 Miles Howthorn, Director of the HALO Trust program in the occupied territories of Karabakh

Removed from the list 
The names of certain people initially declared personae non gratae were taken out of the list following formal requests and apologies on their part.
 Nagehan Alçı, Turkish journalist of Akşam, was blacklisted in 2009 after a two-day visit to Nagorno-Karabakh for research purposes. It was reported that she had referred to Nagorno-Karabakh as "100% Armenian land" in an interview on a television channel broadcast in Nagorno-Karabakh Alçı later denied making such a statement, saying she had never mentioned the history of the region at all. In 2013, she sent a request to the Azerbaijani government asking to exclude her from the "black list" and reaffirming her support of the territorial integrity of "brotherly Azerbaijan". Her request was granted in December 2013.
 Aleksey Mitrofanov, Russian politician, was blacklisted in 2011 for attending the opening ceremony of a banquet hall in Stepanakert. In a letter to the Azerbaijani foreign ministry, he expressed "sincere regret" for having visited Nagorno-Karabakh. The ban on his entry to Azerbaijan was lifted in September 2013.
 James Brooke, an American journalist blacklisted in 2011, was taken down from the list around the same time.
 Al Bano, Italian singer, was declared persona non grata in 2010, after giving a concert in Nagorno-Karabakh. In November 2013, the ban was lifted, after a letter was sent by Al Bano to the Azerbaijani foreign ministry in which stated he had had no information about the situation around Nagorno-Karabakh at the time of his visit. In December 2013, Al Bano visited Azerbaijan together with other Italian pop stars of the 1970s and performed at a joint concert.
 Jürgen Klimke, member of the German Parliament, was on the list since September 2013, after holding a meeting with members of the Armenian community of Nagorno-Karabakh in Stepanakert. In his letter to the Azerbaijani government, Klimke said his visit had been unplanned and he had no idea of its repercussions. He voiced his support for Azerbaijan's territorial integrity and expressed regret with regard to his visit. His name did not appear on the list as of 17 March 2014.
 Constantin Moscovici, Moldovan singer, was excluded from the list in February 2014, after he stated in a letter that his visit to Nagorno-Karabakh was not deliberate and that his position on the territorial integrity of Azerbaijan coincided with that of his country.
 Artemy Lebedev, Russian designer and businessman, was removed from the list in February 2015 after a letter of apology sent to the Azerbaijani ambassador in Russia. In his LiveJournal account, Lebedev wrote that five years prior he had done "a foolish thing" by visiting Nagorno-Karabakh without having done enough research and without a special permission from Azerbaijan. He called on others to obtain one if they ever decide to visit the region.
 Luis Faraoni, sub-editor of the newspaper Tiempo Argentino, was excluded from the list in April 2015, after expressing regret for visiting Nagorno-Karabakh and voicing his support for the territorial integrity of Azerbaijan in a letter addressed to the Ministry of Foreign Affairs of Azerbaijan.
 Swedish diplomat and former EU special representative in the South Caucasus Peter Semneby was excluded from the list in April 2015. According to the spokesperson of the Azerbaijan Ministry of Foreign Affairs, Semneby had said in a letter sent to the Ministry that his unauthorised trip to Nagorno-Karabakh had enabled him to conclude that his opinion on the conflict in fact coincided with that of Azerbaijan. Semneby refused to comment on the fact that he had been blacklisted from 2012 to 2015.
The names of  Yannick Pelletier and  Kevin O'Connell were removed from the list in the wake of the 42nd Chess Olympiad held in Baku, after official letters were submitted on their part to the Ministry of Foreign Affairs of Azerbaijan which the Ministry quoted as expressing regret for visiting the occupied territories of Azerbaijan and reaffirming Azerbaijan's territorial integrity.

Reaction

Azerbaijan
Official
Foreign Ministry of Azerbaijan spokesman Elman Abdullayev said the list is incomplete due to an ongoing investigation of more potential entry violations. Abdullayev also claimed that "if the person who visited the occupied territories of Azerbaijan without the permission of the Azerbaijani side, regrets his actions, aware of the illegality of his visit and will appeal to the relevant authorities of Azerbaijan with an explanation, the Azerbaijani side is willing to consider this appeal on the exclusion of that person from the list."

Non-official
Investigative journalist and radio reporter Khadija Ismayilova, known for her anti-government publications, has noted that some of the people whose names appear on the list, especially those for whom no reason for the ban has been listed, are in fact journalists and human rights activists who apparently were barred from entering Azerbaijan for criticising the Azerbaijani government in their articles, as it was not evident if they had ever visited Nagorno-Karabakh.

Armenia and Nagorno-Karabakh
The Ministry of Foreign Affairs of the Nagorno-Karabakh Republic has criticised the Azerbaijan stance, stating: Azerbaijan replaces the conflict settlement process with attempts to transfer the issue to the auspice of the UN, Council of Europe, European Parliament, and other international organizations. Meanwhile, the Azerbaijani party's requirement for the international organizations, states, and political figures to recognize the territorial integrity of Azerbaijan grows into a political farce and its declaration of the citizens visiting the NKR "persona non grata" – into a comedy. The position of Azerbaijan is fully deprived of even hints of readiness for any compromise or concessions. This reconfirms the fact that official Baku doesn't want to resolve the Karabakh issue, trying to shift the blame for the failure onto Armenia.

International
Official
Following Azerbaijan's protests, governments of some countries whose citizens visited the occupied territory, as well as establishments that they were affiliated with at the time of the visit, described these visits as "personal decisions" of the said individuals and stated that those visits did not represent their official position.

The US State Department Bureau of Consular Affairs website states that "traveling to the region of Nagorno-Karabakh and the surrounding occupied areas via Armenia without the consent of the Government of Azerbaijan could make you ineligible to travel to Azerbaijan in the future."

Non-official
François Rochebloine, Member of the French National Assembly and the head of the France-Armenia Friendship Group, commented on the Azerbaijani decision to ban his entrance to Azerbaijan, stating that it is an "honor" for him to be declared persona non grata in Azerbaijan.

Ueli Leuenberger, a Swiss Member of Parliament, has stated that he is "grateful" for being blacklisted from Azerbaijan.

The Spanish opera singer Montserrat Caballé visited the Nagorno-Karabakh Republic on 4 June 2013. She met the primate of the Diocese of Artsakh, archbishop Pargev Martirosyan, in Shushi's Ghazanchetsots Cathedral. She also visited Gandzasar and Stepanakert, the capital of the Nagorno-Karabakh Republic, where she met with President Bako Sahakyan. On 6 June 2013, the Azerbaijani government declared Caballé persona non grata. On 9 June 2013, the President of Armenia, Serzh Sargsyan, awarded Caballé the Armenian Medal of Honor.

Russian political expert Konstantin Zatulin, who repeatedly travelled to Nagorno-Karabakh to observe elections in the self-declared state, noted that "Azerbaijan demonstrates silliness" by having such a list, while his colleague Sergey Markedonov sarcastically expressed his happiness to have joined the company of Caballe and other celebrities.

According to Russian-Israeli blogger Alexander Lapshin, who is included in the list, "Azerbaijani position towards Armenians is too complicated and Azerbaijanis themselves can not explain the approach of their government."

Wayne Merry, a retired American diplomat and the senior fellow for Europe and Eurasia at the American Foreign Policy Council, condemned the Azerbaijani government and said that "this step first of all harms the Azerbaijani authorities" and it is a "striking example of self-isolation and simple policy."

Argentinian journalist Marcelo Cantelmi who was blacklisted in 2005 wrote: "publishing a blacklist is a despicable and barbaric act. It is a discriminatory method, historically used by dictators and tyrants, that intends to punish divergent opinions in a brutal manner".

Nicholas Wondra, an expert on Caucasus, was found himself in the Azerbaijani "black list" although he has never been in Karabakh. He added that "as far as I have been included in the list, now I must visit Karabakh as an expert on Caucasus."

Zafer Noyan, an ethnic Turkish arm-wrestler, was barred from entering Azerbaijan because his last name resembled that of an Armenian.

Syrian American journalist of Armenian descent Harut Sassounian in an article written in August 2013 stated that "Baku’s Blacklist of Artsakh Visitors Helps Armenia, Hurts Azerbaijan". He added, "Azerbaijan’s leaders may not be aware that some of their incompetent underlings are causing great harm to the interests and reputation of their own country."

See also

References

Armenia–Azerbaijan relations
People declared Persona non grata
Persona non grata in Azerbaijan
Azerbaijan
First Nagorno-Karabakh War
2020 Nagorno-Karabakh war
Azerbaijan
Persona non grata
Persona non grata